Elie Augustus Frederick La Vallette (May 3, 1790 – November 18, 1862) was an American military officer who served in the United States Navy from 1812 to 1862. He served during the War of 1812, in the Mediterranean and Africa Squadrons, and during the Mexican-American War. He was one of the first rear admirals appointed when Congress created the rank in July 1862. Two United States Navy vessels and the borough of Lavallette, New Jersey were named in his honor.

Career
La Vallette was born on May 3, 1790, in Alexandria, Virginia to a distinguished family of French origin. At the age of 10, he accompanied his father, a chaplain, on a cruise in the frigate , commanded by Stephen Decatur, Sr.

After serving in the merchant marine, La Vallette entered the United States Navy on June 25, 1812, as sailing master. On September 11, 1814, he was an acting lieutenant aboard the corvette , the flagship of Commodore Thomas Macdonough at the Battle of Lake Champlain, where the British were defeated in a decisive engagement of the War of 1812. La Vallette distinguished himself during the battle, winning promotion and a medal. He received his commission as lieutenant on December 9, 1814.
 
La Vallette's first command came in June 1817, taking the schooner  on a survey of Virginia's coast and harbors. He served in the Mediterranean Squadron under Commodore Isaac Hull, he was acting captain for several months, and served on the ship until 1828.

After leaving Constitution, La Vallette held a series of routine assignments, before being ordered to take the sloop-of-war  to Guayaquil, Ecuador, to protect the United States interests during a revolution. He sailed from the United States in May 1833, rounding Cape Horn, and finally reaching Guayaquil in February 1834. After receiving assurances that American lives and property would be protected, he returned home, making the voyage from Valparaíso to Hampton Roads in a little more than two months.

He formally anglicized his name to Lavallette in 1830. Lavallette was promoted to master commandant on March 3, 1831, and to captain on February 23, 1840.

From 1842 to 1845, La Vallette served as commandant of the Navy Yard at Pensacola, Florida. During his time as commandant, a government contractor requested that La Vallette order his sailors to assist in the search for escaped slaves used in construction of the Navy Yard, but La Vallette refused.

He played a key role in the capture of Mazatlán and in 1848, served as Military Governor of Mazatlán, and the crew of the Congress comprised the occupying garrison. In 1851 he commanded the Africa Squadron.

On July 30, 1862, President Abraham Lincoln appointed Lavallette a rear admiral on the retired list.

Death and legacy
Lavallette died on November 18, 1862, at the Philadelphia Naval Yard Hospital and was interred in Laurel Hill Cemetery.

Two destroyers of the United States Navy were named  in his honor.

The Borough of Lavallette, New Jersey was named in his honor and was co-founded by his son Albert T. Lavallette.

References

External links

1790 births
1862 deaths
19th-century American naval officers
American people of French descent
Burials at Laurel Hill Cemetery (Philadelphia)
Military personnel from Alexandria, Virginia
Military personnel from Philadelphia
United States Merchant Mariners
United States Navy personnel of the War of 1812
United States Navy personnel of the Mexican–American War
United States Navy rear admirals